Stoneyburn Junior Football Club are a Scottish football club based in Stoneyburn, near Bathgate, West Lothian. They currently play in the East of Scotland Football League. Their home ground is Beechwood Park.

The original Stoneyburn club were founded in 1928 and enjoyed fair success in the 1930s and 1940s. The club reached the Scottish Junior Cup semi-finals in 1950, where they finally lost 4–2 after a second replay to eventual winners Blantyre Victoria, and won the Midlothian Junior League in 1934–35 and 1938–39. During this era, the club built up the ground at Beechwood Park using spoil material from the nearby Foulshiels Colliery, after which their nickname, the Fulshie is derived. Despite some record crowds in this era of 12,000 for big cup matches, the club hit hard times and folded in 1958. The current side joined the SJFA in 1983 after some years in the Juvenile and Amateur levels. 

The SJFA restructured prior to the 2006–07 season, and Stoneyburn found themselves in the 15-team East Region, South Division. They finished 13th in their first season in the division.

The team has been managed since April 2020 by Steven Sharp.

Club staff

Board of directors

Coaching staff

Source

Notable former players
Jimmy Delaney – Celtic, Manchester United and Scotland

Managerial history

c Caretaker manager

¹

References

External links
Official club website

Football clubs in Scotland
Football in West Lothian
Association football clubs established in 1983
Scottish Junior Football Association clubs
1983 establishments in Scotland
East of Scotland Football League teams